Joyce Borenstein is a Canadian director and animator. Borenstein worked extensively in the independent animation field in the 1970s before joining the National Film Board of Canada in the 1980s, culminating in her best known work: the short animated documentary The Colours of My Father: A Portrait of Sam Borenstein (1992) about her father, painter Sam Borenstein, which was nominated for an Academy Award for best short documentary at the 65th Academy Awards.

Borenstein has won the prize for originality at the Canadian International Amateur Film Festival (CIAFF) for her film Tricycle (1970), as well as the Montreal Prize at the Montreal World Film Festival for her film The Plant (1983) which she co-directed with Thomas Vámos.

Early life and education 
Joyce Borenstein was born in Montreal, Quebec. She is the daughter of Sam and Judith Borenstein, both painters whose respective works feature in her films The Colours of My Father: A Portrait of Sam Borenstein and Mother's Colours (2011). She received her Bachelor of Arts in piano performance at McGill University in 1971, and later received her Masters in Film Animation at the California Institute of the Arts in 1974.

Career 
Joyce Borenstein's career as a director and animator has spanned over four decades, beginning with her debut Tricycle in 1970, to her most recent work Mother's Colours in 2011. She worked independently as an animator during the 1970s, winning several student film awards before joining the National Film Board (NFB) in the 1980s. In 1980, Borenstein became a member of the publication board of the International Animated Film Association (ASIFA) in Canada, a newsletter focusing mainly on the activity of Canadian members of the association, many of whom are associated with the animation studios of the NFB. Borenstein's work has been showcased by Quickdraw Animation Studios and festivals across North America and Europe including the Genie Awards, the Columbus International Film & Video Festival, and the Festival of Films on Art in Lausanne, Switzerland. She is currently the company officer of Illumination Magique Inc., an animation company based in Montreal and active since 1994 that has produced several of her films including Mother's Colours and One Divided by Two: Kids and Divorce (1997), as well as a children's picture book, Cat and Bear (2003) written and illustrated by Borenstein herself. Since 1980, Borenstein has held a part-time professorship position in film and animation at Concordia University.

The Colours of My Father: A Portrait of Sam Borenstein 
Joyce Borenstein's best known work came in 1992 with the biographical documentary The Colours of My Father: A Portrait of Sam Borenstein. Produced by the National Film Board, the film details the life and career of her late father who worked intermittently as a painter throughout his time in Montreal. Borenstein, who wrote and directed the piece, employs different documentary and animation techniques including: interviews with her mother, Judith; archival material (such as excerpts from Sam Borenstein's personal journals used as narration and voiced by an actor); and a combination of Borenstein's original animation, snapshots of her father's work, and filmed sequences taking place in Montreal and the Laurentian Mountains. The film was nominated for an Oscar for best short documentary at the 65th Academy Awards, and won for best short documentary at the 12th Genie Awards.

Filmography

Other credits 
 Cat and Bear (2003), author and illustrator

References 

1950 births
Living people
Artists from Montreal
California Institute of the Arts alumni
Canadian animated film directors
Canadian women film directors
Film directors from Montreal
McGill University School of Music alumni
National Film Board of Canada people
Canadian women animators